Edward Jonathon Turpie  is a film producer, businessman and High Sheriff of the West Midlands from 2015 to 2016. He is founder and director of Maverick TV.

Turpie is a board member of Creative England.

He was made a Member of the Order of the British Empire (MBE) in the 2010 New Years honours List, "for services to international trade".

References

External links 

 
 
 
 video interview with Turpie

Members of the Order of the British Empire
Deputy Lieutenants of the West Midlands (county)
High Sheriffs of the West Midlands
Living people
Year of birth missing (living people)
Place of birth missing (living people)
British film producers
21st-century British businesspeople